Frank Mitchell Dazey (April 30, 1892 – June 16, 1970) was an American screenwriter. He wrote for 50 films between 1914 and 1954. He was born in Quincy, Illinois. Son of Charles T. Dazey.

Selected filmography
 Manhattan Madness (1916)
 The Prince of Avenue A (1920)
 Polly of the Storm Country (1920)
 Silk Hosiery (1920)
 Home Stuff (1921)
 Shadows of the Sea (1922)
 Rich Men's Wives (1922)
 Children of Dust (1923)
 Poor Men's Wives (1923)
 Mothers-in-Law (1923)
 The Gold Diggers (1923 - editor)
 For Another Woman (1924)
 Manhattan Madness (1925)
 Klondike Annie (1936)

External links

1892 births
1970 deaths
American male screenwriters
Place of death missing
People from Quincy, Illinois
20th-century American male writers
20th-century American screenwriters
Screenwriters from Illinois